Siparuna calantha is an evergreen dioecious shrub which grows to around 10 m in height. It is found only in the Sierra Nevada de Santa Marta in Colombia. It is similar to Siparuna petiolaris but differs in having much broader leaves.

References

New species of Siparuna

Siparunaceae
Flora of Colombia
Dioecious plants
Plants described in 2000